Nykhor Paul is a Sudanese fashion model. 

Of Nuer ethnicity, Paul was born in what is now South Sudan. Owing to civil conflict, Paul escaped with her family to Ethiopia, where she grew up as a refugee. In 1998 Paul moved to the United States. She lived in Nebraska at age 14. 

Based in New York, Paul has modelled for Vivienne Westwood, Rick Owens, Louis Vuitton and Balenciaga.

References

Living people
Year of birth missing (living people)
Sudanese women
South Sudanese female models
Nuer people
American people of South Sudanese descent